State Highway 50 (Andhra Pradesh) is a state highway in the Indian state of Andhra Pradesh

Route 

It starts at Karnataka border and ends at Madanapalle.

See also 
 List of State Highways in Andhra Pradesh

References 

State Highways in Andhra Pradesh
Roads in Chittoor district